Lhardy is a restaurant located at Madrid in Spain, which was opened in 1839 by Emilio Huguenin Lhardy. It was said to have introduced  French haute cuisine to Madrid. It has a deli and takeaway service on the ground floor and a formal restaurant on the second floor.  It is one of the oldest restaurants of Madrid

External links
Official Site

References

Restaurants in Madrid
French restaurants